Abdul Rohim (born 6 April 1992) is an Indonesian professional footballer who plays as a goalkeeper for Liga 2 club PSMS Medan.

Club career 
He started playing with PSMS as a goalkeeper  in 2017 played in Liga 2. In the season he managed with his club to be promotional team to 2018 Liga 1 as runner-up after beaten Persebaya with a score of 3-2.

The name Abdul Rohim drew public attention after successfully dismissed 3 penalties in the 2018 Piala Presiden match against Persebaya which ended in winning on penalties 7-6.

In the third round of 2018 Liga 1 against Persija Jakarta he injured a posterior cruciate ligament (PCL) injury and had to rest for a while.

Honours

Club 
PSMS Medan
 Liga 2 runner-up: 2017
 Indonesia President's Cup 4th place: 2018
Persebaya Surabaya
 Liga 1 runner-up: 2019
 Indonesia President's Cup runner-up: 2019

References

External links 
 Abdul Rohim at Soccerway

1992 births
Living people
Indonesian footballers
PSMS Medan players
Persebaya Surabaya players
Persela Lamongan players
Liga 1 (Indonesia) players
Liga 2 (Indonesia) players
Association football goalkeepers
Sportspeople from North Sumatra
21st-century Indonesian people